Monokini 2.0 is a social art project launched in 2013. The creative leaders of the project are two Finnish artists, Katriina Haikala and Vilma Metteri, also known as the art duo The Nutty Tarts (fin. Tärähtäneet ämmät).

Background
Ten Finnish fashion designers participated in the Monokini 2.0 project and together designed an haute couture swimwear collection. These swimwears are targeted for women who have experienced breast cancer and have undergone through different operations and changes and in their body, such as mastectomy.

The swimwear collection was photographed by a Finnish photographer Pinja Valja together with Haikala and Metteri. The collection is modeled by 10 breast cancer survivors who have gone through mastectomy. One of the models, miss Elina Halttunen, is also the initiator of the whole project. These photographs form a collection of 10 photographs that have been exhibited in and outside Finland.

Monokini 2.0 project calls for acceptance and respect for all kinds of human bodies and aims to widen the ideas of a beautiful body. Also, the project challenges the presumptions of what is concerned as nudity and disclosure in the Western culture.

The tag line/motto of the Monokini 2.0, "Who says you need two", condenses the message of the whole project: That women can be beautiful with one breast or with no breast at all and every woman should have the right to decide whether she wants to have breast reconstruction after mastectomy or not.

Designers
 Katriina Haikala ja Vilma Metteri / The Nutty Tarts (Tärähtäneet ämmät)
 Outi Les Pyy
 Sasu Kauppi
 Elina Halttunen
 Tyra Therman
 Mert Otsamo
 Timo Rissanen
 Piia Keto ja Marjo Kuusinen / Kaksitvå

Monokini 2.0 Catwalk Show
Monokini 2.0 Catwalk Show was held in Finland's oldest public swimming hall, Yrjönkatu Swimming Hall, on 30 August 2014. The fashion show was the first time the Monokini 2.0 swimwear collection was showcased in public. The catwalk models were the ones who appeared in the original photographs, women who have had mastectomy. 
The show featured live performances by Astrid swan, the Finnish vocal group Mamo and the synchronized swimming group of the Finnish Swimming Association. Together with the performances and the venue Monokini 2.0 Catwalk show was a one-of-a-kind event.

Publicity
Monokini 2.0 project has been noticed both nationally and internationally in various medias. After the first exhibition in the Finnish Museum of Photography, Brogan Driscoll from The Huffington Post all wrote how "Bold, beautiful and empowering, the collection is one of fashion's most powerful collaborations to date."

Julija Néje from the media company Bored Panda explained how the Monokini 2.0 swimwears "help eliminate the discomfort breast cancer survivors face when they go to the beach and show us their bravery, hope and determination."

On 24 May 2014 Lady Gaga’s charity foundation "Born This Way Foundation" wrote about the Monokini 2.0 project on its Facebook page. The post gave so much global attention to the project that the official Monokini 2.0 website two times in one day.

Exhibitions in 2014–2015
 2015 "Monokini 2.0", Finnish institute in Stockholm, Stockholm, Sweden
 2015 "Monokini 2.0", Kunstplass 10, Oslo, Norway
 2014 "Monokini 2.0", Museum Anna Nordlander, Skellefteå, Sweden
 2014 "Monokini 2.0", Finnish Museum of Photography, Helsinki, Finland

See also
 The Nutty Tarts

References

External links
 Monokini2.com
 Shaken-not-blurred.com

Finnish art